Kolonel Bunker is an Albanian, French and Polish historical film released in 1996. It was selected as the Albanian entry for the Best Foreign Language Film at the 69th Academy Awards, but was not accepted as a nominee.

Plot
Enver Hoxha ruled Albania with an iron fist for nearly 40 years, and for a long time Albania was the only Maoist regime and by far the most isolationist society in Europe—politically, psychologically and physically. This film is about Colonel Muro Neto, the man Hoxha charged with constructing the bunkers throughout the country which ostensibly protected Albania from its enemies both without and within. He became known as "Kolonel Bunker."

See also
 List of submissions to the 69th Academy Awards for Best Foreign Language Film
 List of Albanian submissions for the Academy Award for Best Foreign Language Film
 List of Albanian films of the 1990s

References

External links
 

1996 films
Polish historical films
Albanian-language films
Films set in Albania
1990s historical films
French historical films
Albanian historical films
1990s French films